ISO 31-3 is the part of international standard ISO 31 that defines names and symbols for quantities and units related to mechanics.  It is superseded by ISO 80000-4.

Its definitions include (note boldfaced symbols mean quantity is a vector):

00031-3